Antiguraleus aeneus is a species of sea snail, a marine gastropod mollusk in the family Mangeliidae.

Description
The length of the shell attains 11 mm, its diameter 4 mm.

(Original description) The small, solid shell has a cylindro-fusiform shape. It is polished and constricted at the sutures. On decollate specimens six whorls remain, divided by linear sutures. The colour of the shell is amber-brown, with ochraceous reflections. The sculpture shows  prominent, arcuate ribs, each slightly overhanging the one below, seven to a whorl, consecutive on the spire, smaller on the body whorl where they do not reach the base. On the base and snout are six revolving threads. The aperture is rather wide, flanked by a tall and thick varix. The edge of the outer lip is thin, insinuate at the base. The columella is perpendicular and concave. The siphonal canal is short and wide. The sinus is wide and shallow. A prominent callus knob is prominent at the lip insertion.

Distribution
This marine species is endemic to Australia and occurs off Queensland.

References

 Cotton, B.C. 1947. Australian Recent and Tertiary Turridae. Adelaide : Field Naturalist's Section of the Royal Society of South Australia. Conchology Club Vol. 4 pp. 1–34. 
 Wells F.E. (1991) A revision of the Recent Australian species of the turrid genera Clavus, Plagiostropha, and Tylotiella (Mollusca: Gastropoda). Journal of the Malacological Society of Australia 12: 1–33.
 Wilson, B. 1994. Australian Marine Shells. Prosobranch Gastropods. Kallaroo, WA : Odyssey Publishing Vol. 2 370 pp.

External links
 
  Tucker, J.K. 2004 Catalog of recent and fossil turrids (Mollusca: Gastropoda). Zootaxa 682:1-1295.

aeneus
Gastropods described in 1922
Gastropods of Australia